The 2022–23 Big 12 men's basketball season began with the start of the 2021–22 NCAA Division I men's basketball season in November. Regular season conference play begins in December 2022 and concludes in March 2023. The 2023 Big 12 men's basketball tournament will be held March 8–11, 2023, at the T-Mobile Center in Kansas City, Missouri.

Kansas won their sixth national championship at the conclusion of the 2021–22 season, defeating North Carolina in the National Championship. This marks the final season for the Big 12 Conference before expanding to 14 teams.

Coaches

Coaching changes

Head coaches 
Note: Stats are through the beginning of the season. All stats and records are from time at current school only.

Preseason 

Big 12 Preseason Poll

Pre-Season All-Big 12 Team

Player of the Year: Mike Miles Jr., TCU
Newcomer of the Year: Grant Sherfield, Oklahoma
Freshman of the Year: Keyontae George, Baylor

Recruiting classes

Preseason watchlists 
Below is a table of notable preseason watch lists.

Preseason national polls/ratings

Regular season

Conference matrix 

Through end of regular season.

Big 12/SEC Challenge

Big East-Big 12 Battle

Multi-Team Events

Big 12 Players of the Week

Rankings

Record vs Other Conferences 
The Big 12 has a record of 114–25 in non-conference play through games of March 18, 2023

Postseason

Big 12 tournament 

  March 8–11, T-Mobile Center, Kansas City, MO.

Bracket

NCAA Tournament

NIT

Honors and awards

All-Americans 

To earn "consensus" status, a player must win honors from a majority of the following teams: the 
Associated Press, the USBWA, Sporting News, and the National Association of Basketball Coaches.

Other All-American Honors: Marquis Nowell, Kansas State (AP-3, USBWA-3, TSN-3, NABC-3); Keyontae Johnson, Kansas State (AP-3, NABC-3); Marcus Carr, Texas (AP-HM); Adam Flager, Baylor (AP-HM); Mike Miles Jr., TCU (AP-HM)

All-Big 12 awards and teams 

Honorable Mention: Jaren Holmes, (Iowa State), Osun Osunniyi (Iowa State), KJ Adams Jr. (Kansas), Dajuan Harris Jr. (Kansas), Jalen Hill (Oklahoma), Grant Sherfield (Oklahoma), Emanuel Miller (TCU), Timmy Allen (Texas), De’Vion Harmon (Texas Tech), Kevin Obanor (Texas Tech)

Notes

References